Anthony Jeanjean (born 13 May 1998) is a French cyclist who competes in the Freestyle BMX.

Jeanjean began riding BMX in Montpellier, aged 10. He won the inaugural European freestyle BMX Championship as well as French national BMX freestyle gold in 2020.

In June 2021, he was selected for the French team to compete at the delayed 2020 Summer Games.

He again became the French national champion at the event held at the Olympic Park in Montpellier in October 2022. In November 2022 he won the bronze medal at the 2022 UCI Urban Cycling World Championships in the Freestyle BMX held in Abu Dhabi.

References

1998 births
Living people
Place of birth missing (living people)
French male cyclists
BMX riders
Cyclists at the 2020 Summer Olympics
Olympic cyclists of France
21st-century French people